Live from the House of Blues was a 26 part (one hour each) series on TBS that started airing in January 1995 at 12:05 AM Eastern Time on Friday nights and repeated at the same time on Saturday nights. The timeslot was the same timeslot that another TBS music program, Night Tracks once occupied from 1983 to 1992. It featured live music and was fronted by a rotation of celebrity hosts.  The show was produced by Michael Murphy Productions in conjunction with the House of Blues franchise, and was filmed at their Los Angeles location. The program ended its run in 1996. It was sponsored by Pontiac and the Pontiac Sunfire.

References

1990s American music television series
The Blues Brothers